Archery has been an event at the Asian Games since 1978 in Bangkok, Thailand.

Editions

Events

Recurve

Compound

Medal table

List of medalists

List of records

References

 Medalists from previous Asian Games – Archery

External links
 Men's team medalists
 Women's team medalists

 
Sports at the Asian Games
Asian Games
Asian Games